Vrindavan TV is a Hindi-language 24/7 Hindu television channel, owned by Vrinda Channel (P) Ltd,
412, 5th floor, West End Mall,
Janakpuri West, New Delhi.

References

Hindi-language television channels in India
Television channels and stations established in 2015
Hindi-language television stations
Television stations in Delhi
Television stations in New Delhi
2015 establishments in Delhi